Countess Palatine Maria Anna of Zweibrücken-Birkenfeld-Bischweiler (18 July 1753 – 4 February 1824) was Countess Palatine of Birkenfeld-Gelnhausen and Duchess in Bavaria, through her marriage to Duke Wilhelm in Bavaria. Maria Anna was a great-grandmother of Empress Elisabeth of Austria through her son Duke Pius August in Bavaria

Family 
Maria Anna was born in Schwetzingen, as the second daughter of Count Palatine Frederick Michael of Palatinate-Zweibrücken-Birkenfeld-Bischweiler and his wife, Countess Palatine Maria Francisca of Palatinate-Sulzbach.  She was the sister of Maximilian Joseph, later King of Bavaria and Amalie, the last Electress and first Queen of Saxony.

Marriage and issue
Maria Anna married Duke Wilhelm in Bavaria, a son of John, Count Palatine of Gelnhausen and his wife Sophie Charlotte of Salm-Dhaun, on 30 January 1780 in Mannheim. Wilhelm and Maria Anna had two children:

unnamed son (6 May 1782)
Duchess Maria Elisabeth Amalie Franziska in Bavaria (5 May 1784 – 1 June 1849) married the French Marshall Louis Alexandre Berthier, 1st Duc de Wagram and had issue.
Duke Pius August in Bavaria (1 August 1786 – 3 August 1837)

Ancestry

References

1753 births
1824 deaths
Maria Anna
German Roman Catholics
Duchesses of Bavaria
Countesses Palatine of Zweibrücken
People from the Duchy of Württemberg
People from Schwetzingen